Ethel Lake is a lake in Alberta. It is located west of Cold Lake.

See also 
List of lakes of Alberta

References 

Municipal District of Bonnyville No. 87
Ethel Lake